Dover Furnace was a station on the Harlem Line of the New York Central Railroad (now Metro-North Railroad). The station was located across from a freight house owned by a dairy company, and was closed at some point between 1959 and 1968. No station structures remain at the site.

The site of the former Dover Furnace station can be found on the south side of a one lane bridge over the tracks, which carries Dutchess County Route 26.

References

Former New York Central Railroad stations
Former railway stations in New York (state)
Railway stations in Dutchess County, New York
Railway stations in the United States opened in 1848
Transportation in Dutchess County, New York